Natural hafnium (72Hf) consists of five stable isotopes (176Hf, 177Hf, 178Hf, 179Hf, and 180Hf) and one very long-lived radioisotope, 174Hf, with a half-life of  years. In addition, there are 30 known synthetic radioisotopes, the most stable of which is 182Hf with a half-life of  years. This extinct radionuclide is used in hafnium–tungsten dating to study the chronology of planetary differentiation.

No other radioisotope has a half-life over 1.87 years. Most isotopes have half-lives under 1 minute. There are also 26 known nuclear isomers, the most stable of which is 178m2Hf with a half-life of 31 years. All isotopes of hafnium are either radioactive or observationally stable, meaning that they are predicted to be radioactive but no actual decay has been observed.

List of isotopes 

|-
| 153Hf
| style="text-align:right" | 72
| style="text-align:right" | 81
| 152.97069(54)#
| 400# ms [>200 ns]
|
|
| 1/2+#
|
|
|-
| style="text-indent:1em" | 153mHf
| colspan="3" style="text-indent:2em" | 750(100)# keV
| 500# ms
|
|
| 11/2−#
|
|
|-
| rowspan=2|154Hf
| rowspan=2 style="text-align:right" | 72
| rowspan=2 style="text-align:right" | 82
| rowspan=2|153.96486(54)#
| rowspan=2|2(1) s
| β+
| 154Lu
| rowspan=2|0+
| rowspan=2|
| rowspan=2|
|-
| α (rare)
| 150Yb
|-
| rowspan=2|155Hf
| rowspan=2 style="text-align:right" | 72
| rowspan=2 style="text-align:right" | 83
| rowspan=2|154.96339(43)#
| rowspan=2|890(120) ms
| β+
| 155Lu
| rowspan=2|7/2−#
| rowspan=2|
| rowspan=2|
|-
| α (rare)
| 151Yb
|-
| rowspan=2|156Hf
| rowspan=2 style="text-align:right" | 72
| rowspan=2 style="text-align:right" | 84
| rowspan=2|155.95936(22)
| rowspan=2|23(1) ms
| α (97%)
| 152Yb
| rowspan=2|0+
| rowspan=2|
| rowspan=2|
|-
| β+ (3%)
| 156Lu
|-
| style="text-indent:1em" | 156mHf
| colspan="3" style="text-indent:2em" | 1959.0(10) keV
| 480(40) μs
|
|
| 8+
|
|
|-
| rowspan=2|157Hf
| rowspan=2 style="text-align:right" | 72
| rowspan=2 style="text-align:right" | 85
| rowspan=2|156.95840(21)#
| rowspan=2|115(1) ms
| α (86%)
| 153Yb
| rowspan=2|7/2−
| rowspan=2|
| rowspan=2|
|-
| β+ (14%)
| 157Lu
|-
| rowspan=2|158Hf
| rowspan=2 style="text-align:right" | 72
| rowspan=2 style="text-align:right" | 86
| rowspan=2|157.954799(19)
| rowspan=2|2.84(7) s
| β+ (55%)
| 158Lu
| rowspan=2|0+
| rowspan=2|
| rowspan=2|
|-
| α (45%)
| 154Yb
|-
| rowspan=2|159Hf
| rowspan=2 style="text-align:right" | 72
| rowspan=2 style="text-align:right" | 87
| rowspan=2|158.953995(18)
| rowspan=2|5.20(10) s
| β+ (59%)
| 159Lu
| rowspan=2|7/2−#
| rowspan=2|
| rowspan=2|
|-
| α (41%)
| 155Yb
|-
| rowspan=2|160Hf
| rowspan=2 style="text-align:right" | 72
| rowspan=2 style="text-align:right" | 88
| rowspan=2|159.950684(12)
| rowspan=2|13.6(2) s
| β+ (99.3%)
| 160Lu
| rowspan=2|0+
| rowspan=2|
| rowspan=2|
|-
| α (.7%)
| 156Yb
|-
| rowspan=2|161Hf
| rowspan=2 style="text-align:right" | 72
| rowspan=2 style="text-align:right" | 89
| rowspan=2|160.950275(24)
| rowspan=2|18.2(5) s
| β+ (99.7%)
| 161Lu
| rowspan=2|3/2−#
| rowspan=2|
| rowspan=2|
|-
| α (.3%)
| 157Yb
|-
| rowspan=2|162Hf
| rowspan=2 style="text-align:right" | 72
| rowspan=2 style="text-align:right" | 90
| rowspan=2|161.94721(1)
| rowspan=2|39.4(9) s
| β+ (99.99%)
| 162Lu
| rowspan=2|0+
| rowspan=2|
| rowspan=2|
|-
| α (.008%)
| 158Yb
|-
| rowspan=2|163Hf
| rowspan=2 style="text-align:right" | 72
| rowspan=2 style="text-align:right" | 91
| rowspan=2|162.94709(3)
| rowspan=2|40.0(6) s
| β+
| 163Lu
| rowspan=2|3/2−#
| rowspan=2|
| rowspan=2|
|-
| α (10−4%)
| 159Yb
|-
| 164Hf
| style="text-align:right" | 72
| style="text-align:right" | 92
| 163.944367(22)
| 111(8) s
| β+
| 164Lu
| 0+
|
|
|-
| 165Hf
| style="text-align:right" | 72
| style="text-align:right" | 93
| 164.94457(3)
| 76(4) s
| β+
| 165Lu
| (5/2−)
|
|
|-
| 166Hf
| style="text-align:right" | 72
| style="text-align:right" | 94
| 165.94218(3)
| 6.77(30) min
| β+
| 166Lu
| 0+
|
|
|-
| 167Hf
| style="text-align:right" | 72
| style="text-align:right" | 95
| 166.94260(3)
| 2.05(5) min
| β+
| 167Lu
| (5/2)−
|
|
|-
| 168Hf
| style="text-align:right" | 72
| style="text-align:right" | 96
| 167.94057(3)
| 25.95(20) min
| β+
| 168Lu
| 0+
|
|
|-
| 169Hf
| style="text-align:right" | 72
| style="text-align:right" | 97
| 168.94126(3)
| 3.24(4) min
| β+
| 169Lu
| (5/2)−
|
|
|-
| 170Hf
| style="text-align:right" | 72
| style="text-align:right" | 98
| 169.93961(3)
| 16.01(13) h
| EC
| 170Lu
| 0+
|
|
|-
| 171Hf
| style="text-align:right" | 72
| style="text-align:right" | 99
| 170.94049(3)
| 12.1(4) h
| β+
| 171Lu
| 7/2(+)
|
|
|-
| style="text-indent:1em" | 171mHf
| colspan="3" style="text-indent:2em" | 21.93(9) keV
| 29.5(9) s
| IT
| 171Hf
| 1/2(−)
|
|
|-
| 172Hf
| style="text-align:right" | 72
| style="text-align:right" | 100
| 171.939448(26)
| 1.87(3) y
| EC
| 172Lu
| 0+
|
|
|-
| style="text-indent:1em" | 172mHf
| colspan="3" style="text-indent:2em" | 2005.58(11) keV
| 163(3) ns
|
|
| (8−)
|
|
|-
| 173Hf
| style="text-align:right" | 72
| style="text-align:right" | 101
| 172.94051(3)
| 23.6(1) h
| β+
| 173Lu
| 1/2−
|
|
|-
| 174Hf
| style="text-align:right" | 72
| style="text-align:right" | 102
| 173.940046(3)
| 7.0(12)×1016 y
| α
| 170Yb
| 0+
| 0.0016(1)
| 0.001619–0.001621
|-
| style="text-indent:1em" | 174m1Hf
| colspan="3" style="text-indent:2em" | 1549.3 keV
| 138(4) ns
|
|
| (6+)
|
|
|-
| style="text-indent:1em" | 174m2Hf
| colspan="3" style="text-indent:2em" | 1797.5(20) keV
| 2.39(4) μs
|
|
| (8−)
|
|
|-
| style="text-indent:1em" | 174m3Hf
| colspan="3" style="text-indent:2em" | 3311.7 keV
| 3.7(2) μs
|
|
| (14+)
|
|
|-
| 175Hf
| style="text-align:right" | 72
| style="text-align:right" | 103
| 174.941509(3)
| 70(2) d
| β+
| 175Lu
| 5/2−
|
|
|-
| 176Hf
| style="text-align:right" | 72
| style="text-align:right" | 104
| 175.9414086(24)
| colspan=3 align=center|Observationally Stable
| 0+
| 0.0526(7)
| 0.05206–0.05271
|-
| 177Hf
| style="text-align:right" | 72
| style="text-align:right" | 105
| 176.9432207(23)
| colspan=3 align=center|Observationally Stable
| 7/2−
| 0.1860(9)
| 0.18593–0.18606
|-
| style="text-indent:1em" | 177m1Hf
| colspan="3" style="text-indent:2em" | 1315.4504(8) keV
| 1.09(5) s
|
|
| 23/2+
|
|
|-
| style="text-indent:1em" | 177m2Hf
| colspan="3" style="text-indent:2em" | 1342.38(20) keV
| 55.9(12) μs
|
|
| (19/2−)
|
|
|-
| style="text-indent:1em" | 177m3Hf
| colspan="3" style="text-indent:2em" | 2740.02(15) keV
| 51.4(5) min
|
|
| 37/2−
|
|
|-
| 178Hf
| style="text-align:right" | 72
| style="text-align:right" | 106
| 177.9436988(23)
| colspan=3 align=center|Observationally Stable
| 0+
| 0.2728(7)
| 0.27278–0.27297
|-
| style="text-indent:1em" | 178m1Hf
| colspan="3" style="text-indent:2em" | 1147.423(5) keV
| 4.0(2) s
|
|
| 8−
|
|
|-
| style="text-indent:1em" | 178m2Hf
| colspan="3" style="text-indent:2em" | 2445.69(11) keV
| 31(1) y
|
|
| 16+
|
|
|-
| style="text-indent:1em" | 178m3Hf
| colspan="3" style="text-indent:2em" | 2573.5(5) keV
| 68(2) μs
|
|
| (14−)
|
|
|-
| 179Hf
| style="text-align:right" | 72
| style="text-align:right" | 107
| 178.9458161(23)
| colspan=3 align=center|Observationally Stable
| 9/2+
| 0.1362(2)
| 0.13619–0.1363
|-
| style="text-indent:1em" | 179m1Hf
| colspan="3" style="text-indent:2em" | 375.0367(25) keV
| 18.67(4) s
|
|
| 1/2−
|
|
|-
| style="text-indent:1em" | 179m2Hf
| colspan="3" style="text-indent:2em" | 1105.84(19) keV
| 25.05(25) d
|
|
| 25/2−
|
|
|-
| 180Hf
| style="text-align:right" | 72
| style="text-align:right" | 108
| 179.9465500(23)
| colspan=3 align=center|Observationally Stable
| 0+
| 0.3508(16)
| 0.35076–0.351
|-
| style="text-indent:1em" | 180m1Hf
| colspan="3" style="text-indent:2em" | 1141.48(4) keV
| 5.47(4) h
|
|
| 8−
|
|
|-
| style="text-indent:1em" | 180m2Hf
| colspan="3" style="text-indent:2em" | 1374.15(4) keV
| 0.57(2) μs
|
|
| (4−)
|
|
|-
| style="text-indent:1em" | 180m3Hf
| colspan="3" style="text-indent:2em" | 2425.8(10) keV
| 15(5) μs
|
|
| (10+)
|
|
|-
| style="text-indent:1em" | 180m4Hf
| colspan="3" style="text-indent:2em" | 2486.3(9) keV
| 10(1) μs
|
|
| 12+
|
|
|-
| style="text-indent:1em" | 180m5Hf
| colspan="3" style="text-indent:2em" | 2538.3(12) keV
| >10 μs
|
|
| (14+)
|
|
|-
| style="text-indent:1em" | 180m6Hf
| colspan="3" style="text-indent:2em" | 3599.3(18) keV
| 90(10) μs
|
|
| (18−)
|
|
|-
| 181Hf
| style="text-align:right" | 72
| style="text-align:right" | 109
| 180.9491012(23)
| 42.39(6) d
| β−
| 181Ta
| 1/2−
|
|
|-
| style="text-indent:1em" | 181m1Hf
| colspan="3" style="text-indent:2em" | 595(3) keV
| 80(5) μs
|
|
| (9/2+)
|
|
|-
| style="text-indent:1em" | 181m2Hf
| colspan="3" style="text-indent:2em" | 1040(10) keV
| ~100 μs
|
|
| (17/2+)
|
|
|-
| style="text-indent:1em" | 181m3Hf
| colspan="3" style="text-indent:2em" | 1738(10) keV
| 1.5(5) ms
|
|
| (27/2−)
|
|
|-
| 182Hf
| style="text-align:right" | 72
| style="text-align:right" | 110
| 181.950554(7)
| 8.90(9)×106 y
| β−
| 182Ta
| 0+
|
|
|-
| rowspan=2 style="text-indent:1em" | 182mHf
| rowspan=2 colspan="3" style="text-indent:2em" | 1172.88(18) keV
| rowspan=2|61.5(15) min
| β− (58%)
| 182Ta
| rowspan=2|8−
| rowspan=2|
| rowspan=2|
|-
| IT (42%)
| 182Hf
|-
| 183Hf
| style="text-align:right" | 72
| style="text-align:right" | 111
| 182.95353(3)
| 1.067(17) h
| β−
| 183Ta
| (3/2−)
|
|
|-
| 184Hf
| style="text-align:right" | 72
| style="text-align:right" | 112
| 183.95545(4)
| 4.12(5) h
| β−
| 184Ta
| 0+
|
|
|-
| style="text-indent:1em" | 184mHf
| colspan="3" style="text-indent:2em" | 1272.4(4) keV
| 48(10) s
| β−
| 184Ta
| 8−
|
|
|-
| 185Hf
| style="text-align:right" | 72
| style="text-align:right" | 113
| 184.95882(21)#
| 3.5(6) min
| β−
| 185Ta
| 3/2−#
|
|
|-
| 186Hf
| style="text-align:right" | 72
| style="text-align:right" | 114
| 185.96089(32)#
| 2.6(12) min
| β−
| 186Ta
| 0+
|
|
|-
| 187Hf
| style="text-align:right" | 72
| style="text-align:right" | 115
| 186.96459(43)#
| 30# s [>300 ns]
|
|
|
|
|
|-
| 188Hf
| style="text-align:right" | 72
| style="text-align:right" | 116
| 187.96685(54)#
| 20# s [>300 ns]
|
|
| 0+
|
|

References 

 Isotope masses from:

 Isotopic compositions and standard atomic masses from:

 Half-life, spin, and isomer data selected from the following sources.

 
Hafnium
Hafnium